Beyond the Door (and also known as Beyond Obsession) is a 1982 Italian drama film directed by Liliana Cavani.

Cast
 Marcello Mastroianni as Enrico Sommi
 Eleonora Giorgi as Nina
 Tom Berenger as Matthew Jackson
 Michel Piccoli as Mr. Mutti
 Paolo Bonetti
 Maria Sofia Amendolea as Secretary
 Enrico Bergier
 Marcia Briscoe as Nina's Friend
 Cicely Browne as Nina's Grandmother
 Hadija Lahnida as Hassan's Sister
 Leandro Marcoccio as Ira
 Atik Mohamed as Stranded Motorist
 Abdelkader Moutaa
 Mahjoub Raji
 Fatima Regragui as Grandmother's Housekeeper
 Giuseppina Romagnoli as Enrico's Prostitute
 Gary Shebex
 Hammadi Tounsi

References

External links

Filmografia di Liliana Cavani

1982 films
Italian drama films
1980s Italian-language films
1982 drama films
Films directed by Liliana Cavani
Films scored by Pino Donaggio
Films shot in Morocco
Films set in prison
1980s Italian films